Selectel Ltd. (Russian: ООО "Селектел") is a Russian provider of cloud infrastructure and data center services. It was founded in 2008, and it currently owns and operates six data centers in Moscow, St. Petersburg, and the Leningrad region. According to the study conducted by IKS Consulting, Selectel was the 3rd largest cloud infrastructure services provider in Russia in 2020 based on its market share (8.7%). According to the Cnews Analytics research in 2020, the company was the 3rd largest data center operator in Russia in terms of the number of commercial server racks.

History 

The company was founded in 2008 by Vyacheslav Mirilashvil and Lev Binzumovich Leviev, former investors of the Russian social network VKontakte. In order to meet the growing needs of VKontakte, they registered Selectel and launched the first data center in St. Petersburg, Russia. Between 2008 and 2012, Selectel opened 5 new data centers:

 Tsvetochnaya 1 in St. Petersburg
 Berzarina in Moscow
 Dubrovka 1, 2, 3 in the town of Nevskaya Dubrovka, outside of St. Petersburg.

Selectel's sixth and latest Tier III data center, Tsvetochnaya 2, was launched in December 2015 in St. Petersburg, right next to Tsvetochnaya 1.

In November 2015, RIPE NCC included Selectel on their list of K-root node hosts.

On October 10, 2017, Selectel announced a non-financial partnership with Russian-Singapore joint venture SONM by sharing the use of blockchain technology.  The first joint products will be launched in 2018. 

In 2019 the company announced the availability of its services in the Novosibirsk region of Russia, and in 2020 launched its services in Tashkent, Uzbekistan.

In May 2022, Selectel announced that it is building its seventh data center Yurlovsky (the company’s second data center in Moscow).

Services 

Selectel presently offers a variety of brands and services including dedicated physical and virtual server leasing, colocation services, cloud services (managed databases, object storage, Managed Kubernetes and others), and fiber-optic leasing. In 2015, Selectel released two major developments in their line of cloud-based hosting solutions: the Virtual Private Cloud and the vScale brand of cloud servers.

In 2018 Selectel launched a public cloud based on the VMware technologies. In 2021 Selectel received the status of an authorized VMware DRaaS provider which confirms that the infrastructure of Selectel’s cloud powered by VMware fully complies with the technical requirements of VMware.

Selectel is known to rarely take down malicious content or spam services hosted on its network.

Industry awards 
In 2019, Selectel was announced as the winner of the National Data Center Awards (Russian: «Национальная премия ЦОДы. РФ») in the “Cloud of the Year” category.

In 2020, Selectel won the Russian Data Center Awards as the fastest-growing IaaS provider. 

In 2022, Selectel was announced as the winner of the National Data Center Awards (Russian: «Национальная премия ЦОДы. РФ») in the “Data center of the Year” category.

References

Links 

 Official Site

Internet service providers of Russia
Companies based in Saint Petersburg
Russian brands